An Inter-dealer broker (IDB) is specialist financial intermediary that facilitates transactions between broker-dealers, dealer banks and other financial institutions rather than private individuals.

IDBs act as intermediaries in the financial markets working to facilitate transactions between broker/dealers and dealer banks in markets where there is no centralised exchange or market maker such as in the bond market. The largest inter-dealer brokers by trade volume, listed in alphabetical order, are:
ARRACO Global Markets ltd
BGC Partners
GFI Group Inc.
Global Credit Securities LLP
Gottex Brokers SA.
Louis Capital Markets LLP
PO Capital Markets Pty Ltd.
Reuters Transaction Services Ltd
TP ICAP Plc
Tradition (UK) Ltd.
Vantage Capital Markets LLP.

Fixed income securities
In the fixed income markets, IDBs are specialized securities companies serving as intermediaries which facilitate transactions between broker/dealers and dealer banks in the debt markets.

Broker/dealers and other financial institutions utilize the secondary fixed income markets to execute their customers’ orders, trade for a profit and manage their exposure to risk, including credit, interest rate and exchange rate risks. There is no centralized exchange in the fixed income market. As a result, financial institutions need a way to find information, liquidity and anonymity for their trading activity. This need created a demand for the services of perhaps the least known and understood market participants, IDBs.

IDBs in the secondary government, agencies, corporate and other debt markets, also known as “municipal securities broker’s brokers” in the municipal bond markets, are specialized securities companies who act as intermediaries working to facilitate transactions between broker/dealers and dealer banks in these markets. IDBs are sometimes described as providing a “Petri dish” of liquidity in the bond markets. That is, they provide a “nurturing environment” wherein market participants can ascertain information about a given market, thereby eventually facilitating a trade between buyers and sellers.

The IDB community distributes information and facilitates transactions in the secondary, or wholesale, financial debt markets between dealers and dealer banks around the world. Typically, markets which make extensive use of IDBs include the corporate bond, fixed income derivatives, U.S. Government and Agency, municipal securities and emerging markets.

Inter-dealer brokers play varying roles in each of the fixed income markets and have become instrumental to their effectiveness and efficiency. IDBs draw together buyers and sellers so that trades can be executed by market participants.  IDBs provide potential buyers and sellers with the critical market information they need to trade.

Inter-dealer brokers allow;
 Enhancing price discovery and transparency via communicating dealer interests and transactions
 Providing anonymity and confidentiality via their position in the “middle” of trades
 Facilitating information flow via acting as a central information point
 Facilitating enhanced liquidity via their broad range of contacts
 Improving market efficiency via their rapid access to liquidity
 Lowering costs via their provision of prices to traders without incurring staffing costs
Faster processing of trades via new technologies

References

External links
 Understanding Derivatives: Markets and Infrastructure - Chapter 3, Over-the-Counter (OTC) Derivatives Federal Reserve Bank of Chicago, Financial Markets Group

Fixed income